Katsuji Hasegawa (born 3 May 1946) is a Japanese professional golfer.

Hasegawa played on the Japan Golf Tour, winning twice.

Professional wins (9)

Japan Golf Tour wins (2)

*Note: The 1993 Yomiuri Sapporo Open was shortened to 54 holes due to weather.

Japan Golf Tour playoff record (1–2)

Other wins (4)
1979 Chiba Open
1985 Chiba Open
1988 Imperial Open
1989 Ibaraki Open

Senior wins (3)
1997 Japan Media System Cup Old Masters Tournament
2014 Kanto Pro Gold Senior Championship
2015 Kanto Pro Gold Senior Championship

External links

Katsuji Hasegawa at the PGA of Japan official site

Japanese male golfers
Japan Golf Tour golfers
Sportspeople from Chiba Prefecture
1946 births
Living people